Nakayama (written:  lit. "Central Mountain") is a Japanese surname.

The Nakayama are descended from 12th century aristocrat Nakayama Tadachika, most notably as the mother of the Emperor Meiji, Nakayama Yoshiko. Other Nakayama may be related to this branch, or have adopted the name as servants or retainers to the clan. 

Nakayama is the 57th most common name in Japan as of 2008, belonging to approximately 1 out of 474 people, or 270,000 individuals. They are most prevalent in the Tokyo area. 

The Japanese reading of the characters in one of Chinese leader Sun Yat-sen's familiar names, Sun Zhongshan (孫中山), is also read as "Nakayama" in Japanese. 

Other notable people with the surname include:

(Names are listed by field, alphabetically by given name in the western convention of given-name, surname for clarity.)

Academics
Gishu Nakayama (1900–1969), author
Ichiro Nakayama (1898-1981), economist
Ken Nakayama (Born 1942), American psychologist known for prosopagnosia
Paula A. Nakayama (born 1953), Hawaii Supreme Court justice
Tadachika Nakayama (1131–1195), Japanese court noble and author 
Tadashi Nakayama (1912–1964), mathematician
Tadashi Nakayama, (born 1927), artist

Arts and entertainment
, Japanese voice actress
, Japanese actress
Miho Nakayama (born 1970), actress, model, and singer
Nana Nakayama, real name of Nana Yamada, Japanese idol, actor, and talent
Sara Nakayama or Manami Nakayama (born 1974), voice actress
Shinpei Nakayama (1887–1952), songwriter
Shinobu Nakayama (born 1973), actress and singer
Tracy Nakayama (born 1974), American artist
Uri Nakayama (born 1981), singer-songwriter
Yuma Nakayama (1994), actor and singer
Yūsuke Nakayama or Yūsuke Santamaria (born 1971), playwright and entertainer

Politics
Kyoko Nakayama(born 1940), politician and party leader
Masa Nakayama (1891–1976), politician and first female cabinet minister in Japan
Nobuzane Nakayama (1865-1934), baron, son of the last daimyo of the Matsuoka domain
Shō Nakayama or Sun Yat-sen (1866–1925), first President of the Republic of China
Tadayasu Nakayama (1809–1888), scion of the Fujiwara, guardian to Emperor Meiji 
Takamaro Nakayama (1851-1919), marquess, chamberlain to the crown prince Taishō
Taro Nakayama (born 1924), Japanese politician, Minister for Foreign Affairs (1989–1991)
Tosiwo Nakayama (1931–2007), 1st President of the Federated States of Micronesia
Yoshiko Nakayama (1836–1907), concubine to Emperor Kōmei, mother of Emperor Meiji

Sports and martial arts
Akinori Nakayama (born 1943), Olympic gymnast
, Japanese cricketer
, Japanese badminton player
Hakudo Nakayama (1873–1958), martial artist
, Japanese ice hockey player
Jun Nakayama (born 1981), Japanese curler
, Japanese footballer
, Japanese footballer
Masashi Nakayama (born 1967), professional soccer player
Masatoshi Nakayama (1913–1987), karate master
, Japanese footballer
, Japanese marathon runner
, Japanese racing driver
Yuki Nakayama (born 1994), Japanese footballer
, Japanese sport shooter

Others
Gordon Goichi Nakayama (中山 吾一, 1900–1995), Japanese Canadian Anglican priest
, Japanese businessman
Jimmy Nakayama (1943-1965), U.S. Army Pfc. participated in the Battle of la Drang, Vietnam
Miki Nakayama (1798–1887), founder of the Tenrikyo religion
Niki Nakayama (born 1975), American Michelin-starred chef
Yasubei Nakayama or Horibe Yasubei (1670-1703), samurai and master swordsman 

Japanese-language surnames